Fernando David Cardozo Paniagua (born 8 February 2001) is a Paraguayan footballer who plays as winger for Club Olimpia.

Career
Born in Asunción, Cardozo began his career at Olimpia. He made his professional debut on 23 April 2017 in a 2–1 home win over Sportivo Luqueño in the Paraguayan Primera División, but was substituted for Richard Ortiz after 28 minutes. He scored three goals from 30 games in the 2018 season, starting on 14 April in a 4–2 win over Independiente F.B.C. again at the Estadio Manuel Ferreira.

On 30 June 2019, Cardozo moved to Portuguese Primeira Liga club Boavista on a one-year loan with a buying option, arriving days after compatriot Walter Clar. He did not debut until the next 6 June, as a 65th-minute substitute for Heriberto Tavares in a 1–0 home loss to Moreirense.

References

External links

2001 births
Sportspeople from Asunción
Living people
Paraguayan footballers
Paraguayan expatriate footballers
Paraguay youth international footballers
Paraguay under-20 international footballers
Association football wingers
Club Olimpia footballers
Boavista F.C. players
F.C. Vizela players
Paraguayan Primera División players
Primeira Liga players
Liga Portugal 2 players
Paraguayan expatriate sportspeople in Portugal
Expatriate footballers in Portugal